The Jonah Warren House is a historic house at 64 Warren Street in Westborough, Massachusetts.  Estimated to have been built in the 1720s, this -story wood-frame house is one of the oldest buildings in Westborough.  It was built along what was known as the Old Connecticut Path, a former Native American trail.  Jonah Warren, the owner and probable builder, moved to Westborough in 1719.  A tanner by trade, he also helped to build the first meetinghouse in Westborough.

The house was listed on the National Register of Historic Places in 1998.

See also
National Register of Historic Places listings in Worcester County, Massachusetts

References

Houses completed in 1720
Houses in Worcester County, Massachusetts
Buildings and structures in Westborough, Massachusetts
Houses on the National Register of Historic Places in Worcester County, Massachusetts
1720 establishments in Massachusetts